Saakshi Siva is an Indian television and film actor who acts in Tamil and Telugu language films. He is best known for his role in the serial Anandham.

He is currently acting in serials like Maunaragam, No.1 Kodalu, and Akka Mogudu.

Personal life
Siva is the youngest son of Telugu film actor Saakshi Ranga Rao. Siva is married to Rajyalakshmi, and they have a son and a daughter. Siva is also an accomplished badminton player who has won state-level championships, and a keen cricketer.

Filmography

Television

References

External links
 Official website
 

1972 births
Living people
Telugu male actors
Tamil male television actors
Television personalities from Tamil Nadu
Male actors from Tamil Nadu
Male actors in Tamil cinema
21st-century Tamil male actors